Rubroboletus is a genus of bolete fungi in the family Boletaceae. It was circumscribed by Chinese mycologists in 2014 with Rubroboletus sinicus as the type species. Species are characterized by having a reddish cap surface, yellow tubes on the underside of the cap, and an orange-red to blood-red pore surface. Pinkish to red spots (reticula) are present on the stipe surface, and a bluish color change occurs when the bolete flesh is injured. Rubroboletus mushrooms have an olive-brown spore print, and produce smooth spores. Eight species were included in the original circumscription (seven new combinations and one new species); five were added in 2015, and another in 2017.

Although R. sinicus is sold in markets in Yunnan, China, the whole genus is usually deemed poisonous.

Species
Rubroboletus dupainii (Boud.) Kuan Zhao & Zhu L.Yang 2014
 Rubroboletus eastwoodiae (Murrill) D.Arora, C.F.Schwarz & J.L.Frank 2015
Rubroboletus esculentus Zhao, K., Zhao, H.M. 2017 
Rubroboletus haematinus (Halling) D.Arora & J.L.Frank 2015
Rubroboletus latisporus Kuan Zhao & Zhu L.Yang 2014
 Rubroboletus legaliae (Pilát & Dermek) Della Maggiora & Trassinelli 2015
Rubroboletus lupinus (Fr.) Costanzo, Gelardi, Simonini & Vizzini 2015
 Rubroboletus pulcherrimus (Thiers & Halling) D.Arora, N.Siegel & J.L.Frank 2015
Rubroboletus pulchrotinctus (Alessio) Kuan Zhao & Zhu L.Yang 2014
Rubroboletus rhodosanguineus (Both) Kuan Zhao & Zhu L.Yang 2014
 Rubroboletus rhodoxanthus (Krombh.) Kuan Zhao & Zhu L.Yang 2014
Rubroboletus rubrosanguineus (Cheype) Kuan Zhao & Zhu L.Yang 2014
 Rubroboletus satanas (Lenz) Kuan Zhao & Zhu L.Yang 2014
Rubroboletus sinicus (W.F.Chiu) Kuan Zhao & Zhu L.Yang 2014

References

External links

 
Boletales genera